Toby Morris (February 28, 1899 – September 1, 1973) was an American politician and a U.S. Representative from Oklahoma.

Biography
Born in Granbury, Texas, Morris was the son of Lon and Ida Henderson Morris. The family moved to what was then Comanche County, Oklahoma, in 1906 and to Walters, Oklahoma, in 1913. He attended the public schools. He married Ola Baker in 1917, and they had two children.

Career
Leaving high school in his senior year, during World War I, to enlist in the United States Army, Morris served successively as private, corporal, and sergeant with the 110th Combat Engineers, attached to the 35th Division, from October 1917 to May 1919.

Morris studied law and was admitted to the bar in 1920. He was a court clerk of Cotton County, Oklahoma from 1921 to 1925 and a prosecuting attorney from 1925 to 1929. He began the private practice of law in Walters, Oklahoma, in 1929. He served as district judge of the twenty-first judicial district of Oklahoma from 1937 to 1946.

Elected as a Democrat to the 80th and to the two succeeding Congresses, Morris served from January 3, 1947, to January 3, 1953. He was an unsuccessful candidate for renomination in 1952 to the 83rd Congress, and served as district judge of the fifth judicial district of Oklahoma from January 1955 to December 1956. He was elected to the 85th and to the 86th Congresses, serving from January 3, 1957, to January 3, 1961. Morris voted against the Civil Rights Acts of 1957 and 1960.

An unsuccessful candidate for renomination in 1960 to the 87th Congress, Morris served as judge for the Oklahoma State Industrial Court from July 1, 1961, to July 17, 1963. He served as district judge for the State of Oklahoma, retiring in January 1971.

Death
After retirement, Morris resided in Lawton, Oklahoma, where he died on September 1, 1973 (age 74 years, 185 days). He is interred at Sunset Memorial Gardens in Lawton.

References

External links

Toby Morris Collection and Photograph Collection at the Carl Albert Center

1899 births
1973 deaths
People from Granbury, Texas
People from Walters, Oklahoma
People from Lawton, Oklahoma
Oklahoma lawyers
United States Army non-commissioned officers
Democratic Party members of the United States House of Representatives from Oklahoma
20th-century American politicians
20th-century American lawyers
United States Army personnel of World War I